The Dallas Texans were a professional ice hockey team in Dallas, Texas.  They were a member of the United States Hockey League from 1945 to 1949.  They played their home games in the Dallas Ice Arena.

Year-by-year results

References

Ice hockey teams in the Dallas–Fort Worth metroplex
Defunct ice hockey teams in Texas